The Cray XT4 (codenamed Hood during development) is an updated version of the Cray XT3 supercomputer. It was released on November 18, 2006. It includes an updated version of the SeaStar interconnect router called SeaStar2, processor sockets for Socket AM2 Opteron processors, and 240-pin unbuffered DDR2 memory. The XT4 also includes support for FPGA coprocessors that plug into riser cards in the Service and IO blades. The interconnect, cabinet, system software and programming environment remain unchanged from the Cray XT3. It was superseded in 2007 by the Cray XT5.

External links
 News release regarding Hood
 "Cray Introduces XMT and XT4 Supercomputers" on HPCwire
Cray XT4 at top500.org

References 

Xt4
X86 supercomputers